Felipe Nicolás Avenatti Dovillabichus (born 26 April 1993) is a Uruguayan professional footballer who plays as a striker for Belgian First Division A club Kortrijk.

Club career

River Plate
Avenatti made his professional debut for River Plate   on 19 February 2012, in a 2–3 home defeat against Nacional. He scored his first professional goal on 3 June, against Defensor Sporting. He scored 12 goals in 33 games for the River Plate side.

Ternana
On 21 August 2013, Avenatti signed a four-year deal with Italian Serie B side Ternana Calcio for €4 million, signing a four-year contract by his manager Paco Casal (which make him the most expensive purchase in the history of Ternana Calcio). He marked his first goal with rossoverdi in Series B on 17 November 2013 against Pescara. The first season at Ternana he played 25 appearances and 2 goals.

The 2014–2015 season, he scored with a brace at Catanzaro in Italian Cup. In the championship will mark the first day, the network of 2–0 Crotone. After a good start to the season, he scored for Ternana at the umbrian derby on 22 November 2014 against Perugia, after an incredible assist from fellow Uruguayan César Falletti who had dribbled past 5 players plus the goalkeeper, putting the ball near the goal line for Avenatti to score. He concludes the 2014–15 season in Ternana with 12 goals in 39 games in all competitions.

Union SG
On 2 July 2021, he joined Union SG on loan.

Beerschot
On 16 January 2022, Avenatti moved on a new loan to Beerschot.

Return to Kortrijk
On 18 August 2022, Avenatti signed a two-year contract with Kortrijk.

International career
Avenatti made his international debut on 23 June 2013, in a 0–1 defeat against Croatia. He scored his first goal on 6 July, the only of a 1–0 win against Spain. He finished as a runner up for Uruguay as part of the 2013 FIFA U-20 World Cup.

Career statistics

Honours
2013 FIFA U-20 World Cup: Runner Up

References

1993 births
Footballers from Montevideo
Uruguayan people of Italian descent
Uruguayan people of Lithuanian descent
Living people
Uruguayan footballers
Association football forwards
Uruguay under-20 international footballers
Club Atlético River Plate (Montevideo) players
Ternana Calcio players
Sportivo Luqueño players
Bologna F.C. 1909 players
K.V. Kortrijk players
Standard Liège players
Royal Antwerp F.C. players
Royale Union Saint-Gilloise players
K Beerschot VA players
Uruguayan Primera División players
Serie A players
Serie B players
Belgian Pro League players
Uruguayan expatriate footballers
Expatriate footballers in Italy
Uruguayan expatriate sportspeople in Italy
Expatriate footballers in Belgium
Uruguayan expatriate sportspeople in Belgium